Martin Butler (born 3 March 1966) is an English former professional footballer who played as a striker in the Football League for York City, Aldershot, Exeter City, Carlisle United, Scunthorpe United and Scarborough and in non-League football for Macclesfield Town, North Ferriby United and Guiseley. His father, Ian Butler, also played for York City.

References

1966 births
Living people
People from Hessle
Footballers from the East Riding of Yorkshire
English footballers
Association football forwards
York City F.C. players
Aldershot F.C. players
Exeter City F.C. players
Carlisle United F.C. players
Scunthorpe United F.C. players
Macclesfield Town F.C. players
Scarborough F.C. players
North Ferriby United A.F.C. players
Guiseley A.F.C. players
English Football League players